Tom Pyszczynski is an American social psychologist.
He is notable, together with Jeff Greenberg and Sheldon Solomon, for founding the field of Terror Management Theory (TMT). TMT is a theory that is based on the writings of Ernest Becker, along with other existential thinkers such as Søren Kierkegaard, Otto Rank, and Heidegger. At the heart of TMT is the notion that human beings have a unique capacity for self-awareness, which makes them realize that death is inevitable. This realization, which conflicts with people's instinctive need for self-preservation, gives rise to a potential for existential anxiety, or terror, that is greater than that in other animals. To manage this potential for terror, people have constructed cultural worldviews, which assure people of either a literal form of afterlife (e.g., heaven, nirvana) or a symbolic form of death transcendence (e.g., being remembered after one has died). When people live up to the standards implied by their cultural worldviews, they attain a sense of positive self-esteem. Thus, TMT suggests that one major psychological function of self-esteem lies in protecting people against existential anxiety. TMT was explicitly formulated to be open to empirical testing. Indeed, since TMT was first conceived in the 1980s, the theory has inspired hundreds of experiments that were designed to test core ideas of TMT. For instance, in support of TMT, many experiments have shown that reminding people of their own mortality (versus a neutral or aversive control topic) leads people to defend their cultural worldviews more vigorously. For instance, people who are briefly reminded of death are more dismissive of someone who criticizes their culture.

References

1954 births
Living people
American social psychologists